Sexify may refer to:

 "Sexify" (song), a 2012 single by Leah LaBelle
 Sexify (TV series), a Polish television series